The 1998 Cork Senior Football Championship was the 110th staging of the Cork Senior Football Championship since its establishment by the Cork County Board in 1887. The draw for the opening fixtures took place on 14 December 1997. The championship began on 1 May 1998 and ended on 4 October 1998.

Beara entered the championship as the defending champions, however, they were defeated by Nemo Rangers in a second round replay.

On 4 October 1998, Bantry Blues won the championship following a 0-17 to 2-06 defeat of Duhallow in the final. This was their second championship title overall and their first title since 1995.

Duhallow's Mark O'Sullivan was the championship's top scorer with 5-20.

Team changes

To Championship

Promoted from the Cork Intermediate Football Championship
 Douglas

Results

First round

Second round

Quarter-finals

Semi-finals

Final

Championship statistics

Top scorers

Overall

In a single game

References

Cork Senior Football Championship
Cork Senior Football Championship